J. Comp. Phys. may be an erroneous abbreviation for:

 J. Comp. Physiol., Journal of Comparative Physiology
 J. Comput. Phys., Journal of Computational Physics